Green Grow the Lilacs is a 1930 play by Lynn Riggs named for the popular folk song of the same name. It was performed 64 times on Broadway, opening at the Guild Theatre on January 26, 1931, and closing March 21, 1931. It had had an out-of-town tryout, running January 19–24, 1931, at the National Theatre in Washington, D.C. It is the basis of the 1943 musical Oklahoma!, which had a 1955 film adaptation.

Production

The play was produced by the Theatre Guild and directed by Herbert J. Biberman. Franchot Tone portrayed cowboy Curly; June Walker was seen as his sweetheart Laurey. Tex Ritter sang four songs in the role of Cord Elam and was the understudy for the lead part as Curly, though he never had occasion to perform in that role. Theatre Guild board member Helen Westley, who had appeared as Mrs. Muskat in the original Broadway production of Ferenc Molnár's Liliom, played Aunt Eller. Lee Strasberg, later to become a teacher of method acting, played the part of the Syrian peddler.
The play also toured the Midwest, and appeared at the Dallas Little Theatre during the week of March 7, 1932, and again in Dallas at the Festival of Southwestern Plays, on May 10, 1935.

The 1943 Rodgers and Hammerstein musical play  Oklahoma! was based on the Riggs play. It uses newly composed songs in place of the traditional folk songs in Riggs' work, but the plot is largely similar, though the endings are different: unlike the musical, the end of Green Grow The Lilacs is left rather undecided as to Curly's trial for accidentally killing farmhand Jeeter (renamed Jud Fry in the musical). In addition, the cowboy Will Parker is only referred to in the Riggs play and does not actually appear in it; the entire comic subplot involving the fifty dollars that Will must obtain in order to be able to marry Ado Annie is an invention of Hammerstein's.

Green Grow the Lilacs is today rarely performed, while Oklahoma! is a widely acclaimed and popular American musical.

Characters 
 Curly McClain
 Aunt Eller Murphy
 Laurey Williams
 Jeeter Fry
 Ado Annie Carnes
 A Syrian Peddler
 Cord Elam
 Old Man Peck

Setting 

Indian Territory, 1900
 Scene 1 — The "front" or living room of the Williams farmhouse, a June morning
 Scene 2 — Laurey's bedroom
 Scene 3 — The smoke house
 Scene 4 — The porch of Old Man Peck's house, that night
 Scene 5 — The hayfield, a month later
 Scene 6 — The "front" room, three nights later

References

External links 

 Green Grow the Lilacs production credits, Internet Broadway Database
 Green Grow the Lilacs at NMAI
 Broadway's Forgotten Man by Charles Morrow

1931 plays
American plays
Western (genre) plays
Oklahoma!
Plays set in Oklahoma
Fiction set in 1900
Plays set in the 1900s